Tom Wontner (born 25 June 1971) is a British film actor, writer, and producer. His films include My Yacht (2004), Witch's Spring (2004), Hard Case (2006), and several short films.

He was nominated for a Maverick Movie award in 2009, for the movie Dirty Step Upstage. and also won the Festival Prize for Best Actor at the Wreck Beach International Film Festival for his work in My Yacht.

Tom Wontner is the great-grandson of actor Arthur Wontner, best known for his portrayal of Sherlock Holmes.

Selected filmography
Elemental Storage (2009)
The Sick House (2008)
Hard Case (short) (2006)
My Yacht (short) (2006)
A Mind of Her Own (2006)
TrashHouse (2005)
Cross-Eyed Waltz (2005)
Quality Indigo (2005)
Witch's Spring (short) (2004)
The Catch (short) (2004)
Spin & Win (TV series) (2004)
Lonely Face (short) (2003)
Cable Today (TV series) (1994-1995)

References

External links 

1971 births
Film producers from London
Living people
Male actors from London